German singer Sarah Connor has released eleven studio albums, one compilation album, two video albums, and more than three dozen singles and music videos. Her debut studio album, Green Eyed Soul, was released in November 2001. It received mixed reviews, but became a commercial success in Germany, where it reached number two on the German Albums Chart and earned triple Gold certification from the Bundesverband Musikindustrie (BVMI). The album's singles "Let's Get Back to Bed – Boy!" and "From Sarah with Love" became international hits, the latter of which reached number one in Germany and Switzerland, the top ten in Austria, Belgium (Flanders), Hungary, and the Netherlands, and was nominated for "Best National Single" at the 2002 ECHO Awards.

Unbelievable, Connor's second album, reached the top ten in Germany and earned a Gold certification from the BVMI. The album's singles "One Nite Stand (Of Wolves and Sheep)", "Skin on Skin", "He's Unbelievable" and "Bounce" charted in various European territories. "Bounce", which samples Mary J. Blige's 2001 single "Family Affair", peaked within the top twenty on the Australian Singles Chart and was certified Gold by the Australian Recording Industry Association (ARIA). Connor's third album, Key to My Soul, produced the number one singles "Music Is the Key" and "Just One Last Dance", which were both certified Gold by the BVMI. Her fourth record, Naughty but Nice, became her first domestic number one and charted within the top three in Austria and Switzerland. Like its predecessor, it produced two German number-one singles, "Living to Love You" and "From Zero to Hero," that were certified Gold.

In 2005, Connor released Christmas in My Heart, her first Christmas album, which reached number six in Germany, Austria and Switzerland, and contained two top five singles, "Christmas in My Heart" and "The Best Side of Life," both of which would rechart frequently in the years after. The singer's fifth studio album, Soulicious, was released in 2007 and mainly composed of cover versions of Motown music from the 20th century. One year later, her sixth album Sexy as Hell was released, and subsequently charted within the top ten on the Austrian, German and Swiss album charts. Its lead single "Under My Skin" reached number four on the German Singles Chart. In 2009, she collaborated with Enrique Iglesias on the top-ten hit "Takin' Back My Love".

Real Love, her first album released in the 2010s, peaked at number eight on the German Albums Chart. It produced two singles, none of which managed to reach the top ten. Following a longer hiatus, Connor released her first German album, Muttersprache, in 2015. It debuted at number-one in Austria and Germany and became the biggest seller within Connor's discography yet, reaching 11x Gold status in Germany. Its lead single "Wie schön du bist" peaked at number two on the German Singles Chart, marking her highest-charting single in a decade. Muttersprache was followed by Herz Kraft Werke, her third chart topper in Germany and first album to reached number-one album on the Austrian Albums Chart. The album spawned the top ten single "Vincent." In 2022, Connor released her second Christmas album Not So Silent Night. It became her fourth number-one album in Germany.

Albums

Studio albums

Live albums

Video albums

Singles

As a main artist

As a featured artist

Other charted songs

Music videos

References

External links
 SarahConnor.com – official site

Discographies of German artists
Pop music discographies
Discography